Dmitri Viktorovich Borisov (born 25 July 1977) is a Russian former football player.

References

1977 births
Living people
Russian footballers
Russia under-21 international footballers
Association football midfielders
FC Gomel players
Russian expatriate footballers
Expatriate footballers in Belarus
FC Shinnik Yaroslavl players
Russian Premier League players
FC Lokomotiv Moscow players